The 2003–04 season was Ulster Rugby's ninth under professionalism, and their third under head coach Alan Solomons. They competed in the Heineken Cup, the Celtic League and the inaugural Celtic Cup.

The numbers of teams in the Celtic League was reduced from sixteen to twelve in a single league table, with a full home and away schedule increasing each team's fixture list from seven to 22 matches. There would be no playoffs to determine the league's champions, but a knockout competition, the Celtic Cup, was introduced alongside the league. This meant that the Irish provinces could now operate as full-time professional clubs, with provincial players no longer able to play for clubs in the All-Ireland League. Ulster finished second in the table. Tyrone Howe was the league's joint third leading try scorer with nine. In the Heineken Cup, they came third in Pool 1, not qualifying for the knockout stage. They won the Celtic Cup, defeating Edinburgh in the final.

James Topping became the only the second player, after Gary Longwell, to make 100 appearances for Ulster. Tommy Bowe was named IRUPA Young Player of the Year. Roger Wilson was Ulster's Player of the Year.

Head coach Alan Solomons and forwards coach Adrian Kennedy left at the end of the season to join Northampton Saints. Backs coach Mark McCall was named as the new head coach.

Staff

Squad

Senior squad

Players in
 Tim Barker (promoted from Academy)
 Tommy Bowe (promoted from Academy)
 Gary Brown (promoted from Academy)
 Rowan Frost from Connacht
 Ronan McCormack from Connacht
 Seamus Mallon (promoted from Academy)
 Andrew Maxwell (promoted from Academy)
 Rod Moore from Waratahs
 Matt Mustchin from Canterbury Crusaders
 Reece Spee (promoted from Academy)
 Paul Steinmetz from Otago Highlanders

Players out
Mark Blair to Narbonne
Sheldon Coulter (released)
Jan Cunningham (released)
Jeremy Davidson (retired)
Justin Fitzpatrick to Castres
Russell Nelson to Padova
David Spence (released)

2003–04 Heineken Cup

Pool 1

2003-04 Celtic League

Celtic Cup

Quarter-final

Semi-final

Final

Ulster Rugby Awards
The Ulster Rugby Awards ceremony was held at the Ramada Hotel on 20 May 2004. Winners were:

Ulster Rugby personality of the year: Alan Solomons
Ulster player of the year: Roger Wilson
Club Ulster supporters' player of the year: Andy Ward
Schools player of the year: John McCall, Royal School, Armagh
Coach of the year: Kenny Hooks, Royal School, Armagh
Club of the year: Belfast Harlequins
Team of the year: Belfast Harlequins 2nd XV
Youth player of the year: Neville Farr, Banbridge RFC
Dorrington B. Faulkner Award: Brian Banks
Merit award: Bob Montgomery and Brian Elliott, Ravenhill grounds staff
Media liaison of the year: John Dickson, Ballynahinch RFC

References

2003-04
Ulster
Ulster
Ulster